Megachile paraensis is a species of bee in the family Megachilidae. It was described by Mocsáry in 1887.

References

Paraensis
Insects described in 1887